"Speechless" is a song by American singer Lady Gaga from her third EP, The Fame Monster (2009). The song was written by Gaga to convince her father, Joseph Germanotta, to undergo open-heart surgery, in order to repair his malfunctioning aortic valve, and as a reminder for her younger fans to appreciate their parents. "Speechless" is described as Gaga's "Fear of Death Monster".

The 1970s rock music-inspired power ballad received mixed reviews from critics, who praised it for drawing influences from Queen, as well as its sincerity while others criticized it for "com[ing] off as a fraud." "Speechless" debuted on the Billboard Hot 100 at ninety-four for the week of December 12, 2009. Gaga performed the song in a number of live appearances including the 52nd Annual Grammy Awards, the 2009 American Music Awards, the 2009 Royal Variety Performance, and The Monster Ball Tour (2009–2011).

Background
"Speechless" was written by Lady Gaga and produced by Ron Fair. Gaga explained in a November 2009 interview that her father, Joseph Germanotta, had a heart condition for approximately 15 years. She went on to say, "He has or he had a bad aortic valve, and his body for a very long time was only pumping a third of the blood that you're supposed to get every time his heart beat." She added:

"My mom called me and I was very depressed. I was on tour and I couldn't leave, so I went into the studio and I wrote this song 'Speechless,' and it's about these phone calls. My dad used to call me after he'd had a few drinks and I wouldn't know what to say. I was speechless and I just feared that I would lose him and I wouldn't be there."

The song was written as a plea for Germanotta to have the open-heart surgery he needed for his condition. In October 2009, Gaga confirmed that Germanotta had undergone the surgery. "My Daddy had open-heart surgery today. And after long hours, and lots of tears, they healed his broken heart, and mine," she announced through her official Twitter account. She stated that she hoped the song would inspire her younger fans to appreciate their parents. "I have a lot of fans who are really lovely, young, troubled fans, but I want to remind them that you only get one set of parents," she said.

Composition

Musically, "Speechless" is a rock power ballad with influences of 1970s rock, blues rock, glam rock with a slight element of country music as well. The song's musical style has drawn comparisons to David Bowie during the Ziggy Stardust era, Queen and Pink. It consists of vocal harmonies and guitar riffs which, according to PopMatters, are comparable to the work of Freddie Mercury and Queen. "Speechless" was recorded at Record Plant Studios, Los Angeles, California with all live instruments, such as drums, guitars and bass with Gaga playing piano and she described the recording process as "that really organic, delicious feeling". Along with the production works, Fair also did the arrangement and conduction for the recording, while Tal Herzberg played bass guitar and did the audio engineering of the track with Frank Wolff. Other musicians included Abraham Laboriel Jr. who played drums and John Goux on guitar. "Speechless" was mixed by Jack Joseph Puig while the audio mastering was done at Oasis Mastering, Burbank, California, by Gene Grimaldi. Personnel assisting the recording included Ryan Kennedy, Tal Oz and Joe Cory. "Speechless" is set in the time signature of common time, with a tempo of 76 beats per minute. It is composed in the key of C major, with Gaga's vocal range spanning between the high note of C5 to the low note of G3. The song has a basic sequence of C–G/B–Am–G–F as its chord progression.

Critical reception
"Speechless" received mixed reviews from critics. Kitty Empire of The Observer gave a negative review of the song, noting that ballads are Gaga's "weak point". Evan Sawdey of PopMatters noted similarities between the song and the music of Queen, adding, "Although the resulting tune doesn't have the same driving oomph of a peak-era Queen number, the imitation is admirable if not just for the fact that it manages to rub shoulders with such sacred company without once feeling like a gimmick." Sal Cinquemani of Slant Magazine called the song the lone "dud" from The Fame Monster, "not because it's a bad song or poorly performed, but because, like on The Fame, when [Gaga] does try to show her softer side, it comes off as a fraud—at least alongside the rest of her material." Stephen Thomas Erlewine from AllMusic felt that the song had a "galvanized Eurotrash finish" to it, comparing the guitar playing in the song to the work of Noel Gallagher, the lead guitarist of Oasis.

In 2017, Billboard ranked "Speechless" number 29 in its list "The 100 Best Deep Cuts by 21st Century Pop Stars", noting that the ballad "offered one of the first strong indicators of Gaga's aptitude as a traditional pianist-singer-songwriter" and in hindsight was a better indicator of her future career trajectory. In 2022, Claire Lobenfeld of Pitchfork described "Speechless" as a "suggestion of what was to come on the gritty Joanne".

Chart performance
Although it has not been released as a single, "Speechless" debuted on the Billboard Hot 100 chart at ninety-four for the week of December 12, 2009. After the medley performance of the song at the 2010 Grammy Awards, "Speechless" topped the Billboard Hot Singles Sales chart, with sales of 7,000 units according to Nielsen Soundscan, becoming Gaga's third number-one single on this chart. It also shifted an additional 13,000 digital downloads to bubble under the main Hot Digital Songs chart. As of August 2010, the song has sold 197,000 downloads according to Nielsen Soundscan. "Speechless" also debuted on the Billboard Canadian Hot 100 at sixty-seven on the same issue. On the UK Singles Chart, "Speechless" entered the chart at number 106, due to downloads from The Fame Monster. It left the chart the following week but re-entered at number 88 for the week of December 27, 2009. It has sold 60,000 digital downloads and acquired 3.38 million streams.

Live performances

"Speechless" was performed for the first time at the 30th anniversary celebration for the Los Angeles Museum of Contemporary Art on November 14, 2009. Gaga performed the song on and at a pink Steinway & Sons piano decorated with painted-on butterflies. The song was performed while ballet dancers from the Bolshoi Theatre, who danced alongside Gaga in a performance art number directed by artist Francesco Vezzoli and members of Russia's Bolshoi Ballet Academy, titled "The Shortest Musical You Will Never See Again." It was performed at the 2009 American Music Awards. She coupled it with "Bad Romance" from The Fame Monster. Gaga was dressed in a flesh-colored bodysuit wrapped with white piping, embedded with flashing lights imitating ribs and a spine. The performance started with "Bad Romance"; then she segued into "Speechless" by using her microphone stand to break open a glass box with a piano inside. She sat on the piano bench and began the performance, while her piano caught on fire. Throughout the song, she continued to smash liquor bottles on the piano. Both "Bad Romance" and "Speechless" were performed at The Ellen DeGeneres Show on November 25, 2009. Gaga performed the song at the Royal Variety Performance, which was attended by Queen Elizabeth II. Gaga wore a red latex dress inspired by the Elizabethan era, and played a piano suspended ten feet in the air that was supported by stilts.

On December 8, 2009, Gaga performed the song live at the launch party of Vevo in New York City. The musical accompaniment consisted only of Gaga on piano, who appeared with a gigantic platinum blonde hair bow. "Speechless" was present on the setlist of Gaga's Monster Ball Tour (2009–2011). During the original version of the concert series, "Speechless" came after performing an acoustic version of "Poker Face". Jane Stevenson from Toronto Star called the performance the emotional high point of the show. During the revamped Monster Ball shows, Gaga performed the song on a piano that was caught on fire, while wearing bra and knickers.

Gaga was the opening performer of the 52nd Annual Grammy Awards on January 31, 2010. She appeared in a green outfit with glittery shoulder pads. After performing "Poker Face", she was thrown into a flaming bin with the word "Rejected" written on it. Seconds later she re-appeared on stage joined by Elton John, with both of them covered in ashes. They sat at opposite sides of a double piano and sang the track as a medley with John's "Your Song".  Ashley Laderer from Billboard named it Gaga's eleventh best live performance as of 2018, calling it "heartfelt". In April 2010, Gaga held a mini-concert in Japan for MAC Cosmetics, collaborating with Canadian performance artist, Terence Koh. Billed as "GagaKoh", the concert took place on a rotating stage where Koh had created a statue of a naked woman with rabbit ears. "Speechless" was one of the three songs Gaga performed at the event, besides "Bad Romance" and "Alejandro". In May 2011, Gaga performed a jazz version of the song during Radio 1's Big Weekend in Carlisle, Cumbria.

In April 2017, Gaga performed "Speechless" on the piano during both weekends of the Coachella Festival, where she was one of the headliners. On the second show, she included a snippet of "Bad Romance" into her performance of "Speechless".

Credits and personnel
Credits adapted from the liner notes of The Fame Monster.

Lady Gaga – vocals, songwriting, co-production, piano
Ron Fair – production, arrangement and conduction
Robert L. Smith – co-production, audio engineering
Abraham Laboriel Jr. – drums
John Goux – guitar
Frank Wolff – audio engineering
Jack Joseph Puig – audio mixing
Gene Grimaldi – audio mastering at Oasis Mastering, Burbank, California
Ryan Kennedy – assistance
Tal Oz – assistance
Joe Cory – assistance

Charts

Certifications

References

External links
 

2000s ballads
2009 songs
Lady Gaga songs
Rock ballads
Song recordings produced by Lady Gaga
Song recordings produced by Ron Fair
Songs written by Lady Gaga